Jacumba Hot Springs is an unincorporated community in the Mountain Empire area of southeastern San Diego County, California, United States. For statistical purposes, the United States Census Bureau defined Jacumba Hot Springs as a census-designated place (CDP) for the first time in the 2010 census, with a population of 561. The census definition of the area may not precisely correspond to local understanding of the area with the same name. The ZIP code is 91934 and the town lies within area code 619. On February 26, 2013, the United States Board on Geographic Names approved a petition by a citizen committee to change the town's name from Jacumba to Jacumba Hot Springs.

History 

The Kumeyaay peoples occupied the Jacumba area prior to European settlement. They were likely attracted by the warm Jacumba hot spring (temperature ), one of many mineral hot springs which occur up and down the Peninsular Ranges of California. Ranchers occupied the area in the 19th century and were often in conflict with the indigenous population. 15 Kumeyaay and one White died in an event connected to alleged cattle rustling during the Jacumba Massacre of February 27, 1880.

Around the turn of the 20th century, the health and relaxation benefits of natural hot springs began to be commercialized. The Jacumba hot spring is prolific and delivered enough water to fill large public baths, the remains of which can still be seen. The water contains sulfur but has a pleasant clean smell. In 1919 rail service connected Jacumba to San Diego. By 1925 the town had a world class hotel, the Hotel Jacumba. In the 1930s, Jacumba had developed into a top destination and had a population of about 1,150. Many of the foremost movie stars and celebrities of the time regarded Jacumba as a prime destination for relaxation.

Jacumba's role as a prime destination continued through World War II; however as the southernmost California hot spring, it began to feel competition from more northern ones, including Murrieta and Palm Springs. After the new Interstate 8 bypassed Jacumba by two miles, most of the roadside service businesses folded and the community went into economic decline.

The Jacumba Hotel closed and was destroyed in an arson fire in 1983. The ruins stood until 1991. Today, the stub of the massive central fireplace can still be seen. The great public baths closed, the swimming pool was filled in, and the well was capped by its rights-owner.

In the 1980s, the Jacumba Motel was the only hotel facility left in Jacumba. However, the area continues to attract primarily foreign visitors and the motel has acquired rights to the spring and opened a spa. In 2002 the facility was sold with the intent of renovating it into a timeshare spa-type resort. In 2006 it was resold and set up as a bed and breakfast. The facility was closed in from 2010 to 2013. After a complete renovation, it was re-opened on June 28, 2013. It is in operation as the Jacumba Hot Springs Spa and Motel.

Geography

It is served by Old Highway 80; Interstate 8 bypasses the town at a distance of two miles (3 km). The town is located in the Pacific time zone (GMT −08:00).

Jacumba Hot Springs is located on the Mexican border. A small settlement exists on the Mexican side, known as Jacume; the unmanned crossing was closed in 1995. The new, enlarged border fence now runs through the area. The United States Border Patrol maintains an increased presence in the area to curtail smuggling and illegal immigration.

According to the United States Census Bureau, the CDP covers an area of 6.1 square miles (15.9 km), 99.88% of it land, and 0.12% of it water.

Demographics

The 2010 United States Census reported that Jacumba had a population of 561. The racial makeup of Jacumba was 389 (69.3%) White 322 (57.4%) non-Hispanic White), 4 (0.7%) African American, 15 (2.7%) Native American, 6 (1.1%) Asian, 0 (0.0%) Pacific Islander, 114 (20.3%) from other races, and 33 (5.9%) from two or more races. Hispanic or Latino of any race were 207 persons (36.9%).

The Census reported that 561 people (100% of the population) lived in households, 0 (0%) lived in non-institutionalized group quarters, and 0 (0%) were institutionalized.

There were 216 households, out of which 66 (30.6%) had children under the age of 18 living in them, 87 (40.3%) were opposite-sex married couples living together, 29 (13.4%) had a female householder with no husband present, 12 (5.6%) had a male householder with no wife present.  There were 21 (9.7%) unmarried opposite-sex partnerships, and 0 (0%) same-sex married couples or partnerships, while 72 households (33.3%) were made up of individuals, and 24 (11.1%) had someone living alone who was 65 years of age or older. The average household size was 2.60.  There were 128 families (59.3% of all households); the average family size was 3.38.

The population was spread out, with 141 people (25.1%) under the age of 18, 46 people (8.2%) aged 18 to 24, 128 people (22.8%) aged 25 to 44, 167 people (29.8%) aged 45 to 64, and 79 people (14.1%) who were 65 years of age or older.  The median age was 39.9 years. For every 100 females, there were 101.8 males.  For every 100 females age 18 and over, there were 102.9 males.

The homeowner vacancy rate was 7.4%; the rental vacancy rate was 7.9%, while 288 people (51.3% of the population) lived in owner-occupied housing units and 273 people (48.7%) lived in rental housing units.

California Historical Landmark
Near Jacumba is the former site of the Mountain Springs Station a California Historical Landmark number 568 that reads:

NO. 194 MOUNTAIN SPRINGS STATION - From 1862-70, Peter Larkin and Joe Stancliff used a stone house about a mile north of here as a store from which ox teams pulled wagons up a 30% grade. The San Diego and Fort Yuma Turnpike Co. used the site as a toll road station until 1876. The crumbling house was replaced in 1917 by another still visible to its east. But road changes, beginning in 1878 and culminating in today's highway, have left the older stone house ruins inaccessible.

Airport 
Jacumba Airport (L78) CTAF 122.9 MHz. 2500 ft. Asphalt runway.

References 

Census-designated places in San Diego County, California
Hot springs of California
Bodies of water of San Diego County, California
Mountain Empire (San Diego County)
Census-designated places in California